French whisky is whisky produced in France. The distilleries producing French whisky include Glann ar Mor and Warenghem in Brittany, Guillon in the Champagne region, and Grallet-Dupic in Lorraine. Buckwheat whisky is produced by Distillerie des Menhirs in Plomelin, Brittany. There are over 40 whisky distilleries currently operating or opening in France. 

The first French whisky was produced at Warenghem distillery in 1987, who then introduced the first single malt French whisky in 1998. 

According to a study in 2016, the French are the largest consumers of single malt whisky in the world, especially Scotch.

See also

French cuisine
List of whisky brands

References

Notes

Bibliography

External links
Glann ar Mor  – official site 
Guillon – official site 
Warenghem - official site (English) (French) (German) (Breton)
Grallet-Dupic - official site (Rozelieures whisky) (English.
Distillerie du Vercors - official site

 

fr:Whisky en France#Distillation